Bala Sang (also Romanized as Bālā Sang; also known as Balasa) is a village in Misheh Pareh Rural District, in the Central District of Kaleybar County, East Azerbaijan Province, Iran. At the 2006 census, its population was 34, in 8 families.

References 

Populated places in Kaleybar County